Kamalia railway station is  located in Kamalia, Toba Tek Singh District,  Pakistan.

See also
 List of railway stations in Pakistan
 Pakistan Railways

References

External links

Railway stations in Toba Tek Singh District